Chilean expansionism refers to the foreign policy of Chile to expand its territorial control over key strategic locations and economic resources as a means to ensure its national security and assert its power in South America. Chile's significant territorial acquisitions, which occurred mostly throughout the 19th century, paved the way for its emergence as a thalassocracy and one of the three most powerful and wealthiest states in South America during the 20th century. It also formed Chile's geopolitical and national identity as a tricontinental state and one of the countries with the longest coastlines in the world.

After achieving its independence from Spain in 1818, Chile held control of territory spanning roughly the same boundaries of the colonial general captaincy that was under the control of the Spanish Empire's Viceroyalty of Peru. Under the uti possidetis iuris principle that delimited the international boundaries of the newly independent South American states, Chile bordered at its north with Bolivia in the Atacama Desert and at its east with Argentina. To the south, Chile claimed all lands west of the Andes and the entirety of Patagonia (principally for the Strait of Magellan), but in practice controlled only the area down to the Bío Bío River plus the area between Valdivia and Chiloé—the rest of the territory being either controlled by the independent Mapuche of Araucanía or sparsely populated by other indigenous tribes. 

The uti possidetis system proved ephemeral, nonetheless; the lack of formal border treaties caused territorial disputes throughout the continent. This uncertainty presented both challenges and opportunities for Chile, with regional instability creating a precarious state of diplomatic affairs but also allowing the growth of Chilean power ambitions. The Chilean national elite sought to ensure that the country's territorial limits and the regional balance of power would favor their economic and political aspirations. Towards this end, the country increased its military power, especially its naval presence, to pursue a policy of intimidation and force.

To its north, Chile imposed its dominance by eliminating the threat posed by the union of Bolivia with Peru during the War of the Confederation (1836-1839), followed by the conquest of these countries' mineral-rich territories in the Atacama during the War of the Pacific (1879-1884)—in the process leaving Bolivia landlocked and occupying the Peruvian capital. To its south and east, Chile used military force and colonization to occupy Araucanía (1861-1883) and successfully dispute Argentine claims over westernmost Patagonia and the Strait of Magellan—the outbreak of war only narrowly avoided in multiple occasions. Chile's expansionist drive practically culminated with Easter Island's annexation in 1888, but vestiges of it continued well into the 20th century—e.g., the country's claim over Antarctic territory in 1940.

Although Chile did not fulfill all of its territorial ambitions, its relative success attracted the attention of the Western Hemisphere's other major expansionist polity, the United States, and cemented Chile's status as a regional power in Latin America. Chile's territorial expansion also left a legacy of distrust with its neighbors, all of which continue having boundary disputes with Chile. The country's mistreatment of the non-Chilean inhabitants of its conquered territories, particularly the state-sponsored forced cultural assimilation process of "Chilenization", have further led to internal tensions and calls for greater autonomy, if not independence, from the Mapuche and the Rapa Nui.

Origins 

The newly independent Republic of Chile's territorial possessions, inherited from the colonial general captaincy (capitanía general) that was under the control of the Spanish Empire's Viceroyalty of Peru, had left the state surrounded by undefined boundaries. Its northernmost settlement was Copiapó in the southern Atacama Desert, bordering Bolivia; however, its exact boundary was disputed until 1866, when both countries delimited their boundaries at the 24° South parallel from the Pacific Ocean. Its southernmost settlement was Concepción, a few kilometers north of the frontier fortifications between Chile and the Araucanía, the territory that the Mapuche indigenous peoples had successfully retained after defeating Spain in the Arauco War.

History

Conquest of the Atacama 

To its north, Chile imposed its dominance by eliminating the threat posed by the union of Bolivia with Peru during the War of the Confederation (1836-1839), followed by the conquest of these countries' mineral-rich territories in the Atacama during the War of the Pacific (1879-1884)—in the process leaving Bolivia landlocked and sacking the Peruvian capital. 

Chile slowly started to expand its influence and to establish its borders. By the Tantauco Treaty, the archipelago of Chiloé was incorporated in 1826. The economy began to boom due to the discovery of silver ore in Chañarcillo, and the growing trade of the port of Valparaíso, which led to conflict over maritime supremacy in the Pacific with Peru. 

The Boundary treaty of 1881 between Chile and Argentina confirmed Chilean sovereignty over the Strait of Magellan. As a result of the War of the Pacific with Peru and Bolivia (1879–83), Chile expanded its territory northward by almost one-third, eliminating Bolivia's access to the Pacific, and acquired valuable nitrate deposits, the exploitation of which led to an era of national affluence. Chile had joined the stand as one of the high-income countries in South America by 1870.

Occupation of Araucanía 

To its south and east, Chile used military force and colonization to occupy Araucanía (1861-1883) and successfully dispute Argentine claims over westernmost Patagonia and the Strait of Magellan—the outbreak of war only narrowly avoided in multiple occasions.

Colonization of Patagonia 

At the same time, attempts were made to strengthen sovereignty in southern Chile intensifying penetration into Araucanía and colonizing Llanquihue with German immigrants in 1848. Through the founding of Fort Bulnes by the Schooner Ancud under the command of John Williams Wilson, the Magallanes region joined the country in 1843, while the Antofagasta area, at the time part of, Bolivia, began to fill with people.

Annexation of Easter Island 

Chile's interest in expanding into the islands of the Pacific Ocean dates to the presidency of José Joaquín Prieto (1831-1841) and the ideology of Diego Portales, who considered that Chile's expansion into Polynesia was a natural consequence of its maritime destiny. The first stage of the country's expansionism into the Pacific began a decade later, in 1851, when—in response to an American incursion into the Juan Fernández Islands—Chile's government formally organized the islands into a subdelegation of Valparaíso. That same year, Chile's merchant fleet briefly succeeded in creating an agricultural goods exchange market that connected the Californian port of San Francisco with Australia, renewing Chile's economic interest in the Pacific. By 1861, Chile had established a lucrative enterprise across the Pacific, its national currency abundantly circulating throughout Polynesia and its merchants trading in the markets of Tahiti, New Zealand, Tasmania, and Shanghai; moreover, negotiations were also made with the Spanish Philippines, and altercations reportedly occurred between Chilean and American whalers in the Sea of Japan. This period ended as a result of the Chilean merchant fleet's destruction by Spanish forces in 1866, during the Chincha Islands War.

Chile's Polynesian aspirations would again be awakened in the aftermath of the country's decisive victory against Peru in the War of the Pacific, which left the Chilean fleet as the dominant maritime force in the Pacific coast of the Americas. Valparaíso had also become the most important port in the Pacific coast of South America, providing Chilean merchants with the capacity to find markets in the Pacific for its new mineral wealth acquired from the Atacama. During this period, the Chilean intellectual and politician Benjamín Vicuña Mackenna (who served as senator in the National Congress from 1876 to 1885) was an influential voice in favor of Chilean expansionism into the Pacific—he considered Spain's discoveries in the Pacific to have been taken by the British, and envisioned that Chile's duty was to create an empire in the Pacific that would reach Asian shores. In the context of this imperialist fervor in 1886, Captain Policarpo Toro of the Chilean Navy proposed to his superiors the annexation of Easter Island; a proposal that attained support from President José Manuel Balmaceda because of the island's apparent strategic location and economic value. After Toro transferred the rights to the island's sheep ranching operations from Tahiti-based businesses to the Chilean-based Williamson-Balfour Company in 1887, Easter Island's annexation process was culminated with the signing of the "Agreement of Wills" between Rapa Nui chieftains and Toro, in name of the Chilean government, in 1888.

Antarctic claim

Consequences 

In 1978, amid direct negotiations attempting to settle the Beagle conflict, Chilean Dictator Augusto Pinochet assured that Chile had no expansionist intentions, but that his government would "defend the patrimony that belongs to it by right."

In the late 19th and early 20th centuries, Chile temporarily resolved its border disputes with Argentina with the Puna de Atacama Lawsuit of 1899 and the Cordillera of the Andes Boundary Case, 1902.

Chile's rise as a major geopolitical power in the South Pacific also had the consequence of placing it in direct confrontation with the United States.

Criticism 

According to Chilean diplomat Juan Salazar Sparks, the political theories of Andrés Bello and Diego Portales were neither expansionist nor interventionist; rather, he argues, they believed that Chile's status as a maritime nation and its role as a promoter of Pan-Americanism rested on its moral leadership, cultural influence, and success in maintaining the regional balance of power. Moreover, he considers that Chile was forced into wars with Peru and Bolivia in order to protect the regional balance of power, and that the country's participation in the Chincha Islands War is evidence of its commitment to Pan-Americanism. Chilean researcher Felipe Sanfuentes also argues that Chile was not an expansionist country and considers that this perspective is promoted by Argentine irrendentism over Tierra del Fuego and Patagonia.

Notes

References

Bibliography

See also 
American imperialism
Anti-Chilean sentiment
Argentine–Chilean boundary dispute
Chilenization
Expansionist nationalism
Lebensraum

External links 
 "Ministra Bachelet: 'En Chile no hay ánimo expansionista'" – Article about Chilean expansionism in 2004.

Economic history of Chile
History of the foreign relations of Chile
History of Easter Island
History of Patagonia
History of South America
Imperialism
Maritime history
Occupation of Araucanía
War of the Confederation
War of the Pacific
19th-century colonization of the Americas